Aggressive fibromatosis or desmoid tumor is a rare condition.  Desmoid tumors arise from cells called fibroblasts, which are found throughout the body and provide structural support, protection to the vital organs, and play a critical role in wound healing. These tumors tend to occur in women in their thirties, but can occur in anyone at any age. They can be either relatively slow-growing or malignant. However, aggressive fibromatosis is locally aggressive and can cause life-threatening problems or even death when they compress vital organs such as intestines, kidneys, lungs, blood vessels, or nerves. Most cases are sporadic, but some are associated with familial adenomatous polyposis (FAP). Approximately 10% of individuals with Gardner's syndrome, a type of FAP with extracolonic features, have desmoid tumors.

The World Health Organization reclassified desmoid tumors (termed desmoid-type fibromatosis) as a specific type of tumor in the category of intermediate (locally aggressive) fibroblastic and myofibroblastic tumors.

Histologically they resemble very low-grade fibrosarcomas, but they are very locally aggressive and tend to recur even after complete resection. There is a tendency for recurrence in the setting of prior surgery; in one study, two-thirds of patients with desmoid tumors had a history of prior abdominal surgery.

Risk factor
Risk factors for desmoid disease amongst FAP patients include female sex, a 3' APC mutation, a positive family history, and a history of previous abdominal surgery.

Diagnosis

Classification

Desmoid tumors may be classified as extra-abdominal, abdominal wall, or intra-abdominal (the last is more common in patients with FAP). It is thought that the lesions may develop in relation to estrogen levels or trauma/operations.

A 3' APC mutation is the most significant risk factor for intra-abdominal desmoid development amongst FAP patients. FAP patients presenting with an abdominal wall desmoid pre-operatively are at an increased risk of developing an intra-abdominal desmoid post-operatively.

Desmoid tumours of the breast are rare. Although benign, they can mimic breast cancer
on physical examination, mammography and breast ultrasound and can also be locally invasive. Even
though they occur sporadically, they can also be seen as a part of Gardner's syndrome. A high index of suspicion and a thorough triple examination protocol is necessary to detect rare lesions like a desmoid tumour which can masquerade as breast carcinoma. Desmoid tumour of the breast may present a difficulty in the diagnosis especially where imaging studies are not conclusive and suggest a more ominous diagnosis.

Treatment
Treatment may consist of watchful waiting, complete surgical removal, radiation therapy, antiestrogens (e.g. Tamoxifen), NSAIDs, chemotherapy, or ablation (cold, heat, ultrasound). Treatment with oral tyrosine kinase inhibitor drugs (e.g. imatinib, sorafenib, pazopanib) show promising success rates.

Patients with desmoid tumors should be evaluated by a multi-disciplinary team of surgeons, medical oncologists, radiation oncologists, and geneticists.  There is no cure for desmoid tumors; when possible, patients are encouraged to enlist in clinical trials.

A biopsy is always indicated as the definitive method to determine nature of the tumour. Management of these lesions is complex, the main problem being the high rates of recurrence in FAP associated disease. Conversely, for intra-abdominal fibromatosis without evidence of FAP, although extensive surgery may still be required for local symptoms, the risk of recurrence appears to be lower. Wide surgical resection with clear margins is the most widely practiced technique with radiation, chemotherapy, or hormonal therapy being used to reduce the risk of recurrence.

Intestinal transplant is a treatment option for those patients with complicated desmoid tumor, such as those involving the mesenteric root, or those with intestinal failure resulting from the tumor or prior interventions.

References

External links 

Dermal and subcutaneous growths